Aduku is a town in, Kwania District following  the curving out of Kwania from Apac District in  northern Uganda. It Head Quarter location of Kwania District.

Location
The coordinates of the town are:2°01'10.0"N, 32°43'12.0"E (Latitude:2.0194; Longitude:32.7200).

Climate 
The community of Aduku has a tropical savanna climate. It is warm every month with both a wet and dry season. The average annual temperature in the city of Aduku is 56° degrees and there is about 253 inch of rain in a year. It is dry for 136 days a year with an average humidity of 71% and an UV-index of 6.

Points of interest
The following points of interest lie within the town limits or near its boundaries:

 Aduku Central Market
 Aduku Senior Secondary School - A public, mixed high school
 Aduku UCC (Uganda College of Commerce) - A public institution
 Ikwera Girls Secondary School - A public all-girls high school
 West Lango Anglican Diocese
 A branch of Stanbic Bank
 Rwekunye–Apac–Aduku–Lira–Kitgum–Musingo Road passes through the middle of town.

See also
 Apac District
 Ugandan Towns
 Ugandan Roads

References

Populated places in Uganda
Cities in the Great Rift Valley